Verkhnoshyrokivske, formerly Oktiabr, is a village in Novoazovsk Raion (district) in Donetsk Oblast of eastern Ukraine, at 116 km SSE from the centre of Donetsk city, at 24 km SW from Novoazovsk.

The settlement was taken under control of pro-Russian forces during the War in Donbass, that started in 2014. On 13 April 2018 the OSCE claimed that 2 tanks of the pro-Russian forces had used cover of civilian homes in Verkhnoshyrokivske "endangering residents if tanks were targeted."

Demographics
In 2001 the settlement had 282 inhabitants. Native language as of the Ukrainian Census of 2001:
Ukrainian — 77.66%
Russian — 21.63%
Belarusian and Polish — 0.35%

References

Villages in Kalmiuske Raion